Pseudonagoda naessigi is a species of moth of the family Limacodidae. It is found on Sumatra.

References 

Limacodidae
Moths of Sumatra
Moths described in 1990